The Makam Pahlawan (Malay for Heroes' Mausoleum) is the burial ground of several Malaysian leaders and politicians. It is located near the Malaysian national mosque, Masjid Negara in the national capital, Kuala Lumpur. Construction of the mausoleum began in 1963 under its project of the construction of Masjid Negara and was completed in 1965.

The cemetery has an interior and an exterior. Part is covered with a concrete dome in the form of a starburst, each side of which almost touches the ground, and separated by a pond from the outside. In the centre is designed with a decorative symbol of the country, the Emblem of Malaysia (Jata Negara) and carving out new flowers marble from the island of Langkawi. The centre of the domed roof is adorned with gold coloured roses.

The Makam Pahlawan area and the Masjid Negara was gazetted in the National Heritage Act 2005 (Act 645), as a National Heritage site by the Heritage Department on 6 July 2007. The plaque installation ceremony was held on 30 April 2009.

Burials

Inside the dome
 Tun Dr. Ismail Abdul Rahman – second Deputy Prime Minister of Malaysia (died 1973)
 Tun Abdul Razak Hussein – second Prime Minister of Malaysia, Father of Development (died 1976)
 Tun Hussein Onn – third Prime Minister of Malaysia, Father of Unity (died 1990)
 Tun Abdul Ghafar Baba – fifth Deputy Prime Minister of Malaysia (died 2006)

Outside the dome
 Tan Sri Syed Jaafar Syed Hassan Albar – former UMNO Secretary-General and former Minister of Rural Development (died 1977)
 Tun Syed Nasir Ismail – Speaker of the Dewan Rakyat (1978–82) (died 1982)
 Tun Sardon Jubir – Governor of Penang (1975–81) and Minister of Works, Posts and Telecommunications (1957–59) (died 1985)
 Tan Sri Mohamed Noah Omar – Speaker of the Dewan Rakyat (1959–64) and President of the Dewan Negara (1969–70) (died 1991)
 Tan Sri Abdul Kadir Yusuf – Minister of Law and the Judiciary (1974–78) and Attorney General (1963–77) (died 1992)
 Tan Sri Mohamed Khir Johari – Minister of Education (1957–60) (died 2006)
 Tun Fatimah Hashim – Wife of Tan Sri Abdul Kadir Yusuf, Welfare Minister (1970–72) (died 2010)
 Tun Ghazali Shafie – Home Minister (1973–81) and Foreign Minister (1981–84) (died 2010)
 Tun Omar Ong Yoke Lin – President of the Dewan Negara (1973–80) (died 2010)
 Tun Ibrahim Ismail – retired Army General, Chief of Defence Forces (1970–77) (died 2010)
 Toh Puan Norashikin Mohd. Seth – widow of Tun Dr. Ismail Abdul Rahman (died 2010)
 Tan Sri Hamzah Abu Samah – Minister of Culture, Youth and Sports (1971–73) and member of International Olympic Committee (IOC) (1978–2004) (died 2012)
 Tun Suhaila Mohamed Noah – widow of Tun Hussein Onn and daughter of Tan Sri Mohamed Noah Omar (died 2014)
 Tan Sri Dr. Jamaluddin Jarjis – Minister of Science, Technology and Innovation (2004–08) and Ambassador to the United States (2009–12) (died 2015)
 Tun Rahah Mohamed Noah – widow of Tun Abdul Razak Hussein and daughter of Tan Sri Mohamed Noah Omar (died 2020)

Notable burials
 Tun Abdul Razak, second Prime Minister of Malaysia (died 1976) became the first Prime Minister to be buried there.
 Tun Suhailah (died 2014) became the first spouse of the Prime Minister to be buried there.
 Tun Dr. Ismail Abdul Rahman, second Deputy Prime Minister of Malaysia (died 1973) became the first national leader and the first Deputy Prime Minister to be buried there. His widow, Toh Puan Norashikin Mohd. Seth (died 2010) was buried outside the mausoleum dome.
 Tan Sri Syed Jaafar Syed Hassan Albar, former Minister of Rural Development (died 1977) became the first national leader buried outside the mausoleum dome.
 Tun Fatimah Hashim, former Welfare Minister (died 2010) became the first woman leader buried there.
 Tun Ibrahim Ismail, Chief of Defence Forces (1970–77) (died 2010) became the first military person buried there.

External links
 Makam Pahlawan (Malay)
 

1965 establishments in Malaysia
Mausoleums in Malaysia
Buildings and structures in Kuala Lumpur
Tourist attractions in Kuala Lumpur